Kulfi is a frozen dairy dessert originating in the Delhi under the Mughal Empire during the Mughal era in the 16th century. It is often described as "traditional Indian ice cream". Kulfi is a traditional sweet of the Indian subcontinent, where it is commonly sold by street vendors called kulfiwallahs.
It is also popular in Bangladesh, Myanmar, Nepal, Sri Lanka, and the Middle East and part of the national cuisines of India, Pakistan, and Trinidad and Tobago. 

Kulfi is denser and creamier than regular ice cream. It comes in various flavours. Traditional ones include cream (malai), rose, mango, cardamom (elaichi), saffron (kesar or zafran), and pistachio. Newer flavours include apple, orange, strawberry, peanut, and avocado. Unlike ice cream, kulfi is not whipped, resulting in a solid, dense dessert similar to frozen custard. Thus, it is sometimes considered a distinct category of frozen dairy-based dessert. The density of kulfi causes it to melt more slowly than ice cream.

History
The word kulfi comes from the Persian  (قلفی) meaning "covered cup". The dessert originated in Delhi, during the Mughal Empire in the 16th century. The mixture of dense evaporated milk was already popular in the sweet dishes in the Indian subcontinent. During the Mughal period, this mixture was flavoured with pistachios and saffron, packed into metal cones and immersed in slurry ice, resulting in the invention of kulfi. Ain-i-Akbari, a detailed record of the Mughal emperor Akbar's administration, mentions use of saltpeter for refrigeration as well as transportation of Himalayan ice to warmer areas.

Delhi, the former capital of the Mughal Empire, is described as the birthplace of kulfi. However, Australian food historian Charmaine O'Brien suggests that, "...it is likely that (kulfi) originally evolved in the cooler climates of Persia or Samarkand and that the Mughals appropriated the concept and elaborated on it to create the creamy, perfumed dessert that it now is."

Preparation
To prepare kulfi, sweetened, flavoured milk is slow cooked. The milk is stirred almost continuously to prevent it from sticking to the cooking utensil. During this process, the milk condenses and thickens. The slow cooking caramelises the sugar in the mixture and browns its milk proteins, giving kulfi its distinctive taste. The mixture is then poured into moulds (often kulhars) and sealed. The sealed moulds are submerged in an insulated matka filled with ice and salt. This quickly freezes the mixture, giving it a soft, smooth consistency free of ice crystals. Kulfi prepared in this traditional way is called matka kulfi.

The moulds are removed from the freezer 10-15 minutes before serving to allow the kulfi to melt slightly. The kulfi is then removed from the moulds and garnished with ground cardamom, saffron, or pistachios. Kulfi is also served with falooda (vermicelli noodles).

Gallery

See also 

 Malai - another dairy dessert from India.

References

Indian desserts
Ice cream
Frozen desserts
Rajasthani cuisine
Gujarati cuisine
Pakistani cuisine
Mughlai cuisine
Burmese desserts and snacks
Indian dairy products
Indo-Caribbean cuisine
Indian cuisine
Bangladeshi cuisine